

Adam-Troy Castro is a science fiction, fantasy, and horror writer living in Wildwood, Florida.

He has more than one hundred stories to his credit and has been nominated for numerous awards, including the Hugo, Nebula, and Stoker. These stories include four Spider-Man novels, including the Sinister Six trilogy, and stories involving characters of Andrea Cort, Ernst Vossoff, and Karl Nimmitz. Castro is also known for his Gustav Gloom series of middle-school novels and has also authored a reference book on The Amazing Race.

Awards and nominations 
Castro's fiction has been nominated for eight Nebulas, two Hugos, two Seiuns, the World Fantasy Award, and three Stokers.

In 2007, Castro and Jerry Oltion won the Seiun Award for Best Foreign Language Short Story of the Year for "The Astronaut from Wyoming."
  
In 2009, Castro won the Philip K. Dick Award for Emissaries from the Dead.

"The Ten Things She Said While Dying: An Annotation" was nominated for the 2019 World Fantasy Award for Best Short Fiction.

Bibliography

Books
 Lost in Booth Nine: Silver Salamander, 1993.
 X-Men and Spider-Man: Time's Arrow Book 2 The Present, Berkley Boulevard, 1998. With Tom DeFalco.
 Spider-Man: The Gathering of the Sinister Six, Berkley Boulevard, 1999.
 An Alien Darkness, Wildside Press, 2000.
 A Desperate Decaying Darkness, Wildside Press, 2000.
 Spider-Man: The Revenge of the Sinister Six, Ibooks, 2001.
 Spider-Man: The Secret of the Sinister Six, Ibooks, 2002.
 Vossoff and Nimmitz: Just a Couple of Idiots Reupholstering Space and Time, Wildside Press 2002
 Tangled Strings, Fivestar, 2003
 With the Stars in their Eyes (collaborative collection with Jerry Oltion), Wildside Press, 2003
 My Ox is Broken: Roadblocks, Detours, Fast Forwards, and Other Great Moments from TV's THE AMAZING RACE (non-fiction). Benbella Books, 2006.
 The Unauthorized Harry Potter (non-fiction). Borders Books, 2007.
 Emissaries From the Dead: An Andrea Cort Novel. HarperCollins Eos, 2008.
 The Shallow End of the Pool. Creeping Hemlock Press, 2008.
 The Third Claw of God: An Andrea Cort Novel. HarperCollins Eos, 2009.
 Fake Alibis. By Frank Sibila, with Adam-Troy Castro and Caren Kennedy. BenBella, 2009.
 War of the Marionettes: An Andrea Cort Novel. (German). Lubbe, 2010.
 Z is for Zombie. With Johnny Atomic. Eos, 2011
 V is for Vampire. With Johnny Atomic. Eos, 2011.
 Gustav Gloom and The People Taker. Grosset and Dunlap, 2012.
 Gustav Gloom and The Nightmare Vault. Grosset & Dunlap, 2013
 Gustav Gloom and The Four Terrors. Grosset & Dunlap, 2013.
 Her Husband's Hands And Other Stories. Prime Books, 2014.
 Gustav Gloom And The Cryptic Carousel. Grosset & Dunlap, 2014.
 Gustav Gloom And The Inn Of Shadows. Grosset and Dunlap, 2015.
 Gustav Gloom And The Castle of Fear. Grosset and Dunlap, 2016.

Short fiction 
Collections
 Her Husband's Hands And Other Stories. Prime Books, 2014.
 The Author's Wife vs. The Giant Robot. Comicmix LLC, 2022.

Stories

 "The Coward's Option".  Analog. March 2016.

See also

List of horror fiction authors

References

External links

1960 births
Living people
20th-century American male writers
20th-century American novelists
20th-century American short story writers
21st-century American male writers
21st-century American novelists
21st-century American short story writers
American fantasy writers
American horror writers
American male novelists
American male short story writers
American science fiction writers
Analog Science Fiction and Fact people